The 2021–22 season was Nottingham Forest's 156th year in existence, and 14th consecutive season in the EFL Championship. Along with the league, the club also competed in the FA Cup and the EFL Cup. The season covered the period between 1 July 2021 and 30 June 2022.

Managerial changes
On 16 September 2021 Chris Hughton was relieved from his managerial duties with immediate effect, after Forest started the season with only one point from their first seven games. Hughton was succeeded by former Swansea City manager Steve Cooper, who was named as first team head coach on 21 September.

Players

Pre-season and friendlies
Forest announced their pre-season schedule would include friendlies against Alfreton Town, Port Vale, Northampton Town, Crewe Alexandra, Aston Villa and Burnley.

Competitions

EFL Championship

League table

Results summary

Results by matchday

Matches

Play-offs

FA Cup

Nottingham Forest were drawn at home to Arsenal in the third round.

EFL Cup

Forest were drawn at home to Bradford City in the first round and Wolverhampton Wanderers in the second round.

Transfers

In

Transfers in

Loans in

Out

Transfers out

Loans out

New contracts

Statistics

Goals and appearances

|}

Awards

Club

UK Meds Player of the Season

BOXT Goal of the Season

League

Sky Bet Championship Young Player of the Season

Sky Bet Championship Team of the Season

Sky Bet Championship Manager of the Month

Sky Bet Championship Player of the Month

Sky Bet Championship Goal of the Month

EFL's Young Player of the Month

PFA Vertu Motors Fans' Player of the Month

Cup

Emirates FA Cup Player of the Round

References

Nottingham Forest F.C. seasons
Nottingham Forest